Macularia sylvatica is a medium-sized species of air-breathing dextral land snail, a terrestrial pulmonate gastropod mollusc in the family Helicidae. It was once seen as a close relative of the grove snail (Cepaea nemoralis), but does in fact not belong to the genus Cepaea at all.

Geographic distribution and habitat
This westalpine species occurs in Germany, Italy, France, Liechtenstein and Switzerland. The vertical distribution reaches from 265 - 2560m asl. 
It lives in similar habitats as Cepaea nemoralis, such as woods, dunes and grassland, however M. sylvatica tolerates wetter and colder mountain areas than the grove snail can live in.

Description 
Macularia sylvatica is generally similar in appearance to C. nemoralis, although the shell is not as colourful and not as variable as that of the grove snail. Also, the diameter of the shell of these snails is smaller than that of grove snails; the brown area is continuous; and the spire of the shell is blunt. The most significant trait is the formation of the colour bands on the shell, where at least the upper two appear to be "interrupted".

References

 

Helicidae
Gastropods described in 1801